Magonia  is a plant genus in the family Sapindaceae, with a single currently accepted species, Magonia pubescens, a tropical tree native to South America. Magonia  is a synonym of Ruprechtia, a genus in the family Polygonaceae.

References

Sapindaceae genera
Dodonaeoideae